Mahtaman is a village in the Punjab province of Pakistan. It is located at 30°45'45N 74°10'50E with an altitude of 177 metres (583 feet).

References

Villages in Punjab, Pakistan